Yuki, also known as Ukomno'm, is an extinct language of California, formerly spoken by the Yuki people. The Yuki are the original inhabitants of the Eel River area and the Round Valley Reservation of northern California. Yuki ceased to be used as an everyday language in the early 20th century and its last speaker, Arthur Anderson, died in 1983. Yuki is generally thought to be distantly related to the Wappo language.

Classification
Yuki consisted of three dialects, from east to west: Round Valley Yuki, Huchnom (Clear Lake Yuki) and Coast Yuki. These were at least partially mutually intelligible, but are sometimes counted as distinct languages.

These languages are categorized as (Northern) Yukian within the Yuki–Wappo family, which also includes the distant Wappo language. It is thought that the ancestor of the Yukian languages diverged from Wappo around 1500 . The three Yukian languages diverged from each other over the last one thousand years, while dialectal variations in Wappo are even more recent. The most likely catalyst or, at least, influence on the separation of Yukian and Wappo was the expansion of the Pomo, leading to pomoization of the Wappo language and physical separation between the Yuki and the Wappo tribes.

Vocabulary
Yuki had an octal (base-8) counting system, as the Yuki keep count by using the four spaces between their fingers rather than the fingers themselves. Yuki also had an extensive vocabulary for the plants of Mendocino County, California.

Grammar
An extensive reference grammar of Yuki was published in 2016 and is based primarily on the texts and other notes recorded by Alfred L. Kroeber from Yuki speaker Ralph Moore in the first decade of the 20th century as well as elicited material recorded from other speakers later in the 20th century. This grammar also contains sketches of Huchnom and Coast Yuki based on the notes of Sydney Lamb and John Peabody Harrington, respectively.

Phonology

An alveolar stop /t/ is an apico-alveolar stop articulated as [t̺].

References

External links

Northern Yukian language overview at the Survey of California and Other Indian Languages
OLAC resources in and about the Yuki language

Indigenous languages of California
Extinct languages of North America
Languages extinct in the 20th century
Yuki–Wappo languages